The 1892–93 French Rugby Championship was the second edition of the annual French rugby union championship under the auspices of the USFSA, a one off game between Racing Club de France and Stade Français. Stade Français defeated Racing Club de France in the final to win the Bouclier de Brennus.

The tournament was played by five clubs, with a preliminary round, semifinals and final.

Preliminary round

Semifinals

Finale 

The referee,  Thomas Ryan, had participated 1884 at the first tour by New Zealand in New South Wales.

External links
Compte rendu de la finale de 1893, sur lnr.fr

1893
France
Championship